Grodno Castle (Hrodna Castle) may refer to:
 Old Grodno Castle, Grodno, Belarus
 New Grodno Castle, Grodno, Belarus